Switzerland has submitted 46 films for the Academy Award for Best International Feature Film since their first entry in 1961. The award is handed out annually by the United States Academy of Motion Picture Arts and Sciences to a feature-length motion picture produced outside the United States that contains primarily non-English dialogue.

, five Swiss films have been nominated for the Academy Award for Best Foreign Language Film, and two of these have won the award, most recently for the Turkish refugee drama Journey of Hope at the 1991 Academy Awards.

Submissions
The Academy of Motion Picture Arts and Sciences has invited the film industries of various countries to submit their best film for the Academy Award for Best Foreign Language Film since 1956. The Foreign Language Film Award Committee oversees the process and reviews all the submitted films. Following this, they vote via secret ballot to determine the five nominees for the award. Below is a list of the films that have been submitted by Switzerland for review by the academy for the award by year and the respective Academy Awards ceremony.

The Swiss submission is decided annually by the Federal Office for Culture.

Since they began submitting regularly in 1972, they have only failed to enter a film on three occasions: 1977, 1978 and 2003. In 1994, the Swiss entered but were disqualified in a controversial ruling in which AMPAS determined that one of the favorites, Krzysztof Kieslowski's Red, was not a majority Swiss production.

Director Alain Tanner had had his films selected five times, but none have been nominated. Xavier Koller and Swiss-based French director Jean-Luc Godard have each been selected to represent Switzerland three times.

Switzerland has four official languages. Twenty-two of the Swiss submissions have been French-language films, while fourteen were in some variety of German, and only one in Italian, but none have been in Romansh. In addition, two Swiss submissions were in Turkish.

See also
List of Academy Award winners and nominees for Best Foreign Language Film
List of Academy Award-winning foreign language films
Cinema of Switzerland

Notes

References

External links
The Official Academy Awards Database
The Motion Picture Credits Database
IMDb Academy Awards Page

Switzerland
Academy Award